HMS Severn was an  of the British Royal Navy, launched in 1813 as one of five heavy frigates built to match the powerful American frigates. The shortage of oak meant that she was built of "fir" (actually pine), which meant a considerably shortened lifespan. Nonetheless, the ship saw useful service, especially at the bombardment of Algiers in 1816, before being broken up in 1825.

Background
Relative to her prototype, she received two more guns forward. Tagus was renamed Severn on 7 January 1813, i.e., well before her launching.

War of 1812
Initially commissioned under the command of Captain Joseph Nourse, Severn served in the North Atlantic. On 18 January 1814 she was escorting a convoy from England to Bermuda when she encountered the French 40-gun frigates Sultane and Étoile. Severn drew them away from the convoy, saving it. After a long chase, the French frigates gave up and sailed away.

Later the same year, on 1 May, she captured the American privateer schooner Yankee Lass, armed with nine guns and carrying a crew of 80 men. She was 20 days out of Rhode Island and had not made any captures.

Severn was among the several British warships that shared in the proceeds of the capture on 10 July of the American schooners William, Eliza, Union, and Emmeline, and the capture on 2 July of the schooner Little Tom.

In the late summer and autumn of 1814, Severn was an important participant in the War of 1812, as she was stationed in Chesapeake Bay to blockade the Patuxent River. It was from this point that the British launched their invasion of Maryland, which led to the Battle of Bladensburg and then the subsequent burning of Washington D.C. On 2 July Severn and Loire captured two schooners, two gun-boats, and a sloop. They also destroyed a large store of tobacco.

On 20 August Severn, the frigate , and the gun-brig  sailed up the Patuxent to follow the boats as far as possible. Admiral Alexander Cochrane and his force of marines and seamen entered Washington on the night of 24 August. The British then burnt the White House, the Treasury, and the War Office. They left at 9 o'clock on the evening of the next day and returned to Nottingham, Maryland, on the Patuxent where Cochrane boarded Manly. The campaign cost the Navy one man killed and six wounded, including one man of the Corps of Colonial Marines killed and three wounded.

The draught of this class of frigate was too deep to permit Severn and her sister ships from sailing into the harbour at Baltimore. Her sailors had to kedge rafts holding small cannon and rocket launchers seven miles up the river to Fort McHenry. During the attack on Baltimore Admiral Sir George Cockburn raised his flag on Severn. Although the navy contributed seamen and marines to the land attack, and took casualties, Severn did not suffer any losses.

Between 1 October 1814 and 25 March 1815, Severn captured thirteen mostly small American merchant vessels, but with several armed vessels among them. These were:
 schooner Speedwell, of five men and 34 tons;
 brig May Flower, of 8 men 60 tons;
 ship Anna Marie, of six men and 120 tons;
 ship Betsy;
 ship Virginia;
 schooner Nonsuch, of five men and 65 tons;
 ship Buonaparte;
 ship Anna;
 schooner Virginia;
 schooner Brant;
 ship Necessity, of four guns, 12 men, and 309 tons;
 schooner Amelia, of 40 tons;
 schooner Resolution; and
 privateer brig Ino, of nine guns, 130 men, and 250 tons.

On 20 December Severn also captured the American letter of marque schooner Banyer. Banyer was armed with four guns and carried a crew of 31 men.

On 10 January 1815, Cockburn landed on Cumberland Island in an effort to tie up American forces and keep them from joining other American forces to help defend New Orleans, Louisiana, and the Gulf Coast.

Five days later a British force first bombarded and then landed near Fort Peter on Point Peter by the town of St. Marys. The British attacked and took the fort without suffering any casualties. They then headed for St. Marys along the St. Mary's River and captured it after skirmishing with a small American  force. The British captured two American gunboats and 12 merchantmen, including the East Indiaman Countess of Harcourt, which an American privateer had captured on her way from India to London. The British ended their occupation of St. Marys after about a week and withdrew to Cumberland Island.

On 26 February 1815, Severn recaptured the merchantman Adventure, which she sent in to Bermuda. This earned Severn salvage money for the vessel and her cargo.

Lastly, on 3 March, Severn destroyed the American privateer Ino (see above). American accounts report that Ino grounded outside of Charleston on 7 March. As her crew was attempting to free Ino, Severn came on the scene and launched her boats to board Ino. Inos crew, unaware that the war had ended on 15 February 1815, fired grapeshot and small arms at the British boats, causing them to shear off. Inos crew then set fire to her and took to their boats and some improvised rafts. A schooner that came out from Charleston rescued almost all. Inos crew believed that Captain Nourse of Severn had known for some days that the war had ended. The delay of payment of the head money may have been due to the need to adjudicate the case.

Post-war
Severn was fitted at Chatham for foreign service between February and July 1816. In February the Hon. Frederick W. Aylmer assumed command of Severn. He then sailed her to Gibraltar and then took part in the bombardment of Algiers on 27 August. British casualties were heavy, though those of the Algerines were much heavier. Severn herself had three men killed and 34 wounded. As a result of the attack, the Dey agreed to abolish the enslavement of Christians in perpetuity, and to free all slaves whatsoever then in Algiers. The British also destroyed four large frigates, five large corvettes, numerous gunboats, and numerous merchant vessels. King Ferdinand of the Two Sicilies bestowed on Aylmer the cross of a Commander of the Royal Sicilian Order of St. Ferdinand and of Merit. Other captains and officers received similar awards. In May 1818 the participants in the battle were granted an award of £100,000. In 1847 the Admiralty issued the Naval General Service Medal with clasp "Algiers" to the 1328 surviving claimants from the battle.

Severn initially remained in the Mediterranean, first under Captain James Gordon and then under Captain Robert Spencer. From May 1817 Severn saw service off the Kent and Sussex coasts in the Royal Naval Coast Blockade for the Prevention of Smuggling. under the command of Captain William ("Flogging Joey") McCulloch, scourge of the smugglers.

On 6 August 1817 she seized a boat with foreign spirits and five empty boats. Three weeks later she seized Mary, with four smugglers and a quantity of tea, and also seized two empty boats.

On 15 December Severn seized Po, which was carrying a cargo of foreign spirits. 
On 29 March 1818 Severn seized Linot, which was carrying foreign spirits, and two smugglers.

Fate
Severn was in ordinary at Portsmouth in 1822, but by 1824 was at Deptford. She was put up for sale in June 1825 at Deptford, and sold to John Small Sedger, Rotherhithe, for £3,610 on 20 July.

Notes

Citations

References
 
 
  
 

1813 ships
Ships built by the Blackwall Yard
Age of Sail frigates of the United Kingdom
War of 1812 ships of the United Kingdom